Willie and the Boys: Willie's Stash, Vol. 2 is a collaborative studio album by Willie Nelson and his sons Lukas and Micah. The release is the second volume of the series Willie's Stash, a collection of archival releases selected by Nelson. The material contained on the album was recorded during the sessions for the 2012 album Heroes.

The tracks consist of country standards, featuring seven songs penned by Hank Williams. It was recorded by engineer Steve Chadie at Nelson's Pedernales studio. The release was announced for October 20, 2017.

Commercial performance
The album debuted at No. 19 on Billboard's Top Country Albums chart. It has sold 21,300 copies in the United States as of February 2018.

Track listing

Charts

References

2017 albums
Willie Nelson albums